The Humanist International (also known as the International Humanist Party) is a consortium of political parties adhering to universal humanism (also known as Siloism, after the nickname of the movement's founder), founded in 1989 by over 40 national parties.

The five basic principles of Humanist International are:

 The value of human life as the central value, above money and power, etc.
 Equality of all human beings
 Freedom of belief and ideas
 Development and creation of alternative economic models to the current neoliberal one
 Methodology of active non-violence

History 
Humanist International was founded in Florence, Italy, on January 4, 1989, by the approval of foundational documents and statutes by over 40 Humanist Parties from around the world. These foundational documents included the Universal Declaration of Human Rights, a declaration of principles, a thesis and a basis for political action.

The second congress of the Humanist International was held in Moscow in October 1993. In this meeting, the document of the Humanist Movement was added to the foundational documents.

In January and July 1999, the Humanist International launched the regional bodies of Latin America and Europe respectively. Africa and Asia are in the process of forming their own regional bodies.

In December 1989, in Chile, Laura Rodríguez became the first elected representative of any Humanist Party in the world after winning a seat as part of the Concertación coalition, after Augusto Pinochet handed over power.

The Argentine Humanist Party won a seat in the Deliberative Council in Santa Rosa, La Pampa in 2015.

The Chilean Humanist Party was a part of the Broad Front coalition for the 2017 parliamentary elections. The coalition won 20 seats in the Chamber of Deputies, three of which went to the Humanist Party.

Member parties 
Humanist Party of Angola
Humanist Party (Argentina)
Humanist Party (Chile)
Humanist Party (Iceland)
Humanist Party (Italy)
Paraguayan Humanist Party
Humanist Party (Spain)

Defunct member parties
Humanist Party (Denmark)
Humanist Party (Hungary)
Humanist Party (Portugal)
Humanist Party of Ontario
Humanist Party of Quebec
Humanist Party of Switzerland
Romanian Humanist Party

External links

 

Political internationals
it:Movimento Umanista#Internazionale Umanista